The Indiana Treasurer of State is a constitutional and elected office in the executive branch of the government of Indiana. The treasurer is responsible for managing the finances of the U.S. state of Indiana. The position was filled by appointment from 1816 until the adoption of the new Constitution of Indiana in 1851, which made the position filled by election. As of 2018, there have been fifty-five treasurers. The incumbent is Republican Dan Elliott who has served in the position since January 9, 2023.

Term limits and qualification

The Indiana State Treasurer is a constitutional office first established in the 1816 Constitution of Indiana, and was made largely to mirror the position of the treasurer during Indiana's territorial period. Between 1816 and until 1851, the treasurer was nominated by the governor and confirmed by the state senate. With adoption of the current constitution in 1851 the treasurer's office was filled by a public statewide election every four years.

Treasurers take office on February 10 following their election and hold office for four years. Should they resign, be impeached, or die in office the governor has the power to appoint a temporary treasurer to serve until the next general election. The new treasurer, either appointed to elected may only complete the term of the previous treasurer, not serve a new four-year term. A treasurer may be elected to consecutive terms, but may serve no more than eight years in any twelve-year period. As of 2007, the salary for the treasurer is $66,000 annually.

Powers

The treasurer's powers are both constitutional and statutory. The treasurer's constitutional powers make him the chief financial officer of the state government and give him control over all of the state's financial assets. Because the state operates with a large reserve fund, this give the treasurer control over a large amount of money. In 2007, the total state portfolio was valued at over $5 billion. The treasurer is permitted to invest the funds several different ways, including investments in United States Treasury securities, certificates of deposit, repurchase agreements,  and money market mutual funds.

The Indiana General Assembly has assigned the treasurer additional statutory power and made him a member of the state Board of Finance, Indiana Finance Authority, Indiana Transportation Finance Authority, State Office Building Commission, Recreational Development Commission, Indiana Grain Indemnity Fund Board, Indiana Underground Storage Tank Financial Assurance Board, and the Indiana Heritage Trust Committee. Additionally, the treasurer is the vice-chairman of the Indiana Housing Finance Authority and the Indiana State Police Pension Fund. As a member of these boards, the treasurer has a wide range of influence on the state's financial management.

The treasurer is also the head of several of the most important state financial organizations. The treasurer is chairman of the Indiana Bond Bank, a state controlled bank that provides financing to municipal government to allow for large infrastructure investments. The bank then sells the debts as secured bonds on the national market. This allows local governments to secure credit a low rate of interest. The treasurer is also the chairman of the Indiana Education Savings Authority which manages savings accounts for college educations. The treasurer chairs the Public Deposit Insurance Fund and the Board for Depositories that insures the deposits of municipal governments in the state, much as the Federal Deposit Insurance Corporation insures private accounts, except without limiting the amount of the insurance. The Indiana Institute for Public Funds Management is private organization that was developed to provide financial education for municipal government leaders. The treasurer is designated by the organization its chairman.

List of treasurers

Territorial treasurers

State treasurers

Notes

See also

Government of Indiana

Sources

External links

Government of Indiana
 
1816 establishments in Indiana